Franklin Nathaniel Jonas (born September 28, 2000) is an American former child actor.

Jonas voiced Sōsuke in the 2009 film Ponyo and was a recurring character in the Disney Channel series Jonas. He also appeared in a minor role in the Disney Channel original movie Camp Rock 2: The Final Jam. He has also made appearances on Married to Jonas on E! which follows the life of his brother Kevin Jonas. In 2009, Jonas won "Choice Breakout TV Star Male" at the Teen Choice Awards.

Early life

Childhood life and family
Frankie Nathaniel Jonas was born on September 28, 2000,  in Ridgewood, New Jersey, the youngest son of Denise (née Miller) and Paul Kevin Jonas Sr. He has three older brothers, Kevin (born 1987), Joe (born 1989), and Nick (born 1992). He is sometimes referred to as the "Bonus Jonas" and "Biff". He is of Italian (from a maternal great-grandfather), German, Cherokee, English, Irish, Scottish, and French-Canadian descent. He spent most of his teens residing in Westlake, Texas where the brothers bought a home and he attended Carroll Senior High School.

Education
In 2019, Jonas graduated from the Blackbird Academy in Nashville with a certificate in audio engineering and moved to Los Angeles to start his career as a studio engineer. He started taking astrophysics and writing classes in November 2020 at Columbia University where he is currently studying.

Career
In 2009, Jonas voice acted in Hayao Miyazaki's animated film Ponyo, released in American theaters on August 14, 2009. He played Sōsuke, a character who is befriended by a juvenile fish named Ponyo (voiced by Noah Cyrus), who wants to become a human girl. They both sing the theme song of the movie. He appeared as a recurring character in the Disney Channel Original Series, Jonas for which he won the award for "Choice Breakout TV Star Male" at the 2009 Teen Choice Awards. His first on-screen movie role was in Camp Rock 2: The Final Jam, alongside his older brothers the Jonas Brothers as Junior Rocker Trevor. He also appeared in the E! reality show, Married to Jonas, following Kevin Jonas and his wife Danielle in their married life, including the comeback of the Jonas Brothers in late 2013.

In June 2017, Jonas posted his debut track on SoundCloud called "Shanghai Noon". Less than a year later, he uploaded "Appa" on the same platform. In January 2019, he produced Alli Haber's song "Too Young".

Jonas had 1.9 million followers on TikTok as of July 2022. On March 31, 2021, it was announced that Jonas had signed with UTA, the agency that represents his three older siblings.

Personal life
In a March 2021 interview, he discussed his suicidal thoughts, his alcoholism and his struggle to sobriety. He is a student at Columbia University taking astrophysics and academic writing classes. Jonas dislikes being referred to as the "Bonus Jonas"; his older brothers promised to stop calling him that after he said that he found it "hurtful". In September 2021, Jonas, Charli D'Amelio, Suni Lee, and Lil Huddy were all seen wearing a Scientology necklace on TikTok. The prank has received some backlash due to the scandals associated with Scientology. The post has since been deleted.

Discography

Singles

Music videos

Filmography

Television

Film

Web

Awards and nominations

References

External links

 

2000 births
Living people
21st-century American male actors
People from Ridgewood, New Jersey
Male actors from New Jersey
American male child actors
American male television actors
American male voice actors
American people of Cherokee descent
American people of English descent
American people of French-Canadian descent
American people of German descent
American people of Irish descent
American people of Italian descent
American people who self-identify as being of Native American descent
American people of Scottish descent
Jonas Brothers
Jonas family
American child actors
American TikTokers
Columbia University alumni